The Sunny South may refer to:

The Sunny South (magazine), an American literary magazine
The Sunny South (painting), an 1887 painting by Australian artist Tom Roberts
The Sunny South or The Whirlwind of Fate, a 1915 Australian silent film

See also
Sunny South (disambiguation)